Barbary Coast is the term used by Europeans from the 16th until the 19th century to refer to the coastal regions of what is now Morocco, Algeria, Tunisia, and Libya.

Barbary Coast may also refer to:

Places
 Barbary Coast, San Francisco
 Barbary Coast Trail, a walking tour in San Francisco, California
 Barbary Coast Lounge, a former nightclub in Portland, Oregon
 Lincoln Park, Newark, also called the Barbary Coast
 The Cromwell Las Vegas, formerly known as the Barbary Coast Hotel and Casino

Media
 Barbary Coast (film), a 1935 movie directed by Howard Hawks
 Barbary Coast (musical), a 1978 musical
 Barbary Coast (TV series), a made-for-TV movie and subsequent television show starring William Shatner
 "Barbary Coast", an instrumental composition by Jaco Pastorius on the album Black Market
 "Barbary Coast", an arc/episode of the The Boys comic book/television series, introducing Soldier Boy I
 "Coast of High Barbaree", a traditional song which was popular among British and American sailors

See also
 Battle of the Barbary Coast, a 1592 naval engagement between English and Spanish forces
 Berberia (genus), a genus of butterflies from North Africa
 Barbary (disambiguation)
 Barbary Coast Bunny, a 1956 Bugs Bunny cartoon short
 Barbary Coast Gent, a 1944 American film
 BarBri
 Flame of Barbary Coast, a 1945 American Western film
 The Last Night of the Barbary Coast, a 1913 American film
 Law of the Barbary Coast, a 1949 American historical crime film
 "A Night on the Barbary Coast", a short story by Kage Baker
 Pirates of the Barbary Coast, the fourth installment of the constructible strategy game Pirates of the Spanish Main